Bush hat can mean any of the following:
 Slouch hat
 Boonie hat
 Bucket hat